The Rocklin Unified School District is a California education district serving the Rocklin area.  It consists of twelve elementary schools, two middle schools, two high schools, and the Rocklin Alternative Education Center.

Rocklin Elementary is the oldest school in the district, although its location has changed a few times. Parker Whitney is the oldest school in the district that has maintained same location.  The newest school is Sunset Ranch Elementary school in the Whitney Ranch area, which opened for students in August 2010.

History

In 2008, a grades 7–12 charter school called Western Sierra Collegiate Academy requested twice of Rocklin Unified School District for permission to use its facilities at either Whitney or Rocklin High School. An August 20 district board meeting, the Rocklin Unified School District's trustees unanimously denied the charter school the permission it sought. Superintendent Kevin Brown backed the district's decision. The administration of the district's charter Rocklin Academy, however, supported the creation of what would be the district's fourth charter school. Rocklin Academy brought the matter to the California Department of Education, which deliberated on 12 March 2009. The academy was approved, and was able to rent space previously occupied by Sierra Christian Academy.  This location was chosen due to RUSD's intransigence in providing suitable facilities, the need to begin the 2009/2010 school year, and to stay within budget for facilities rental. Both Rocklin Academy campuses are tenants of Rocklin School District, paying fair market rates for schools that would otherwise be generating debt, rather than revenue.  WSCA sought to be a paying tenant as well.

Elementary schools

Antelope Creek Elementary School

Breen Elementary School
Breen Elementary is a K-6 school located in Rocklin, California. It opened in late August, 1994 with a population of 177 students. As of 2012, its population is approximately 700 and its principal is Chuck Thibideau. As of 2019, principal is Jennifer Palmer.

Cobblestone Elementary School

Parker Whitney Elementary School

Rock Creek Elementary School

Rocklin Academy (charter school)
Rocklin Academy is a public, tuition free, charter school, which was developed by parents and teachers for the Rocklin area. Rocklin Academy is sponsored by the Rocklin Unified School District.

Rocklin Elementary School

Ruhkala Elementary School

Sierra Elementary School
Sierra Elementary is an IB school. Sierra, the home of the sharks (their mascot) focuses on enhancing students learning through many different methods.

Sunset Ranch Elementary School

Twin Oaks Elementary School

Valley View Elementary School 
Valley View Elementary School's principal as of 2013 is Shari Anderson. It goes from Kindergarten all the way to 6th grade.

Middle schools

Granite Oaks Middle School

Granite Oaks Middle School is located near the Rocklin High School.

In Granite Oaks, the principal as of 2022 is Mr. Holmes, and the vice principal is Mr. Anaya. The Academic Performance Index (API) is one of the highest in all of California, according to the California Department of Education.

Granite Oaks Middle School is made up of eight Academies. Each Academy has between two and four teachers. 8th grade academies include Quest, Talon, Sierra, and Discovery. 7th grade academies include Key, Legacy, Odyssey, and Rubicon. It is one of the most advanced schools in the Rocklin Unified School Districts.

Granite Oaks provides two C-STEM (Computer Science, Technology, Engineering, and Math), for both 7th and 8th grade. Their devoted academies are Rubicon (7th) and Discovery (8th), which operate as a regular academy, but they include more technology in their classrooms. 

Granite Oaks also provides a program for Gifted and Talented Education, GATE, which are the Key (7th) and Quest (8th) Academies. These academies provide accelerated courses in Math, with Accelerated Math, for 7th grade, in which they go over Math 7 and 8, and Integrated I in 8th grade. There is an Advanced English course for 8th Grade, a preparatory course for Rocklin and Whitney High School's respective courses.

Spring View Middle School
As of August 2022, Spring View Middle School's principal is Danielle Lauer, with Sarah Vickers serving as assistant principal.
Spring View's Academic Performance Index (API) is one of the highest in all of California, with academic achievements earning it recognition as a California Distinguished School. In addition, Spring View students have won national recognition in Academic Pentathlon competitions. Its Integrated Math and Spanish Language programs each provide students with the opportunity to earn high school level academic credit prior to entering high school. 

Spring View Middle School instructs 7th and 8th grades, with students assigned to core teaching teams designed to concentrate focus on the individual academic and social/emotional needs of each student. Elective choices include Family and Consumer Science, Computer Science, Leadership, Spanish, Chorus, Orchestra, Symphonic and Jazz Bands. Extra-curricular opportunities exist for Art Club, Chess Club, Yearbook, Teen Life (Christian club), California Junior Scholastic Federation, a newly-formed Garden Club initiated by teacher Erin Brady that was featured in local news reports, and an East Coast Tour that encompasses visits to Washington DC, Boston, and New York City. Spring View's athletic teams routinely win championships, with its Wrestling and Boys Basketball teams taking championship rankings in Spring and Winter 2022, respectively. Though, there has been some fighting at school and the percentage of fights happening at the school has risen.

High schools
 Rocklin High School
 Whitney High School
 Western Sierra Collegiate Academy

Rocklin Alternative Education Center
 Rocklin Independent Charter Academy
 Victory High School

References

External links
 

School districts in Placer County, California